Spiceland is a town in Spiceland Township, Henry County, Indiana, United States. The population was 890 at the 2010 census.

History
Spiceland was platted in 1850. The town was so named on account of spice bushes near the original town site. It was primarily an agricultural area for spices.

In February 2001 James Parker and Robert Tulloch, wanted in the 2001 Dartmouth College murders in New Hampshire, were arrested at a truck stop here. They had hitchhiked with truckers to this point and been tracked down by police after a driver's casual announcement on his CB radio that the pair were traveling west.

Geography

Spiceland is located at  (39.837743, -85.436089).

Demographics

2010 census
As of the census of 2010, there were 890 people, 353 households, and 256 families living in the town. The racial makeup of the town was 98.5% White, 0.1% African American, 0.2% Asian, 0.7% from other races, and 0.4% from two or more races. Hispanic or Latino of any race were 0.7% of the population.

There were 353 households, of which 34.8% had children under the age of 18 living with them, 58.4% were married couples living together, 9.3% had a female householder with no husband present, 4.8% had a male householder with no wife present, and 27.5% were non-families. 24.9% of all households were made up of individuals, and 13.3% had someone living alone who was 65 years of age or older. The average household size was 2.52 and the average family size was 2.99.

The median age in the town was 39.5 years. 26.9% of residents were under the age of 18; 5.9% were between the ages of 18 and 24; 23.6% were from 25 to 44; 27.1% were from 45 to 64; and 16.5% were 65 years of age or older. The gender makeup of the town was 49.0% male and 51.0% female.

2000 census
As of the census of 2000, there were 807 people, 327 households, and 240 families living in the town. The racial makeup of the town was 98.14% White, 0.12% African American, 0.25% Native American, 1.12% from other races, and 0.37% from two or more races. Hispanic or Latino of any race were 1.61% of the population.

There were 327 households, of which 30.3% had children under the age of 18 living with them, 64.2% were married couples living together, 7.6% had a female householder with no husband present, and 26.6% were non-families. 24.2% of all households were made up of individuals, and 12.2% had someone living alone who was 65 years of age or older. The average household size was 2.47 and the average family size was 2.92.

In the town, the population was spread out, with 25.0% under the age of 18, 7.7% from 18 to 24, 30.7% from 25 to 44, 23.9% from 45 to 64, and 12.6% who were 65 years of age or older. The median age was 36 years. For every 100 females, there were 93.1 males. For every 100 females age 18 and over, there were 88.5 males.

The median income for a household in the town was $45,875, and the median income for a family was $54,904. Males had a median income of $37,333 versus $28,393 for females. The per capita income for the town was $20,419. About 2.3% of families and 2.5% of the population were below the poverty line, including 3.1% of those under age 18 and 6.9% of those age 65 or over.

Education
The town has a lending library, the Spiceland Town-Township Public Library.

References

External links
 Spiceland Preservation and Tourism Society (SPATS)

Towns in Henry County, Indiana
Towns in Indiana